Ross Atkinson McEwing (October 17, 1888 – 1966) was a farmer and politician in Ontario, Canada. He represented Wellington North in the Legislative Assembly of Ontario from 1937 to 1951 as a Liberal.

The son of James McEwing, who also served in the Ontario assembly, and Louisa S. Atkinson, he was born in Maryborough township. In 1913, he married Florence Grose. McEwing was a vice-president of the Union Telephone Company and served on municipal council from 1932 to 1937.

References

External links

1888 births
1966 deaths
Ontario Liberal Party MPPs